Maysville is a city in DeKalb County, Missouri, United States. The population was 1,095 at the 2020 census. Maysville is the county seat of DeKalb County.

Maysville is part of the St. Joseph, MO–KS Metropolitan Statistical Area.

History
 Maysville was founded in 1845. The name may be a transfer from Maysville, Kentucky. A post office called Maysville has been in operation since 1846.

The DeKalb County Courthouse was listed on the National Register of Historic Places in 1998.

Geography
Maysville is located in central Dekalb County at the intersection of Missouri routes 6 and 33.

Demographics

2010 census
As of the census of 2010, there were 1,114 people, 433 households, and 272 families living in the city. The racial makeup of the city was 97.6% White, 0.4% African American, 0.5% Native American, 0.1% Asian, 0.1% Pacific Islander, and 1.3% from two or more races. Hispanic or Latino of any race were 0.4% of the population.

There were 433 households, of which 33.0% had children under the age of 18 living with them, 46.7% were married couples living together, 11.5% had a female householder with no husband present, 4.6% had a male householder with no wife present, and 37.2% were non-families. 32.6% of all households were made up of individuals, and 18.9% had someone living alone who was 65 years of age or older. The average household size was 2.47 and the average family size was 3.15.

The median age in the city was 39.3 years. 26.5% of residents were under the age of 18; 7.7% were between the ages of 18 and 24; 22.9% were from 25 to 44; 24.1% were from 45 to 64; and 18.9% were 65 years of age or older. The gender makeup of the city was 45.7% male and 54.3% female.

2000 census
As of the census of 2000, there were 1,212 people, 457 households, and 302 families living in the city. The population density was 1,065.9 people per square mile (410.5/km2). There were 491 housing units at an average density of 431.8 per square mile (166.3/km2). The racial makeup of the city was 98.76% White, 0.08% African American, 0.33% Native American, 0.17% Asian, 0.33% from other races, and 0.33% from two or more races. Hispanic or Latino of any race were 0.50% of the population.

There were 457 households, out of which 34.4% had children under the age of 18 living with them, 52.7% were married couples living together, 10.1% had a female householder with no husband present, and 33.7% were non-families. 30.9% of all households were made up of individuals, and 18.8% had someone living alone who was 65 years of age or older. The average household size was 2.49 and the average family size was 3.14.

In the city, the population was spread out, with 28.5% under the age of 18, 6.5% from 18 to 24, 25.7% from 25 to 44, 17.1% from 45 to 64, and 22.1% who were 65 years of age or older. The median age was 38 years. For every 100 females, there were 85.3 males. For every 100 females age 18 and over, there were 81.9 males.

The median income for a household in the city was $27,727, and the median income for a family was $36,979. Males had a median income of $28,382 versus $18,646 for females. The per capita income for the city was $11,871. About 12.4% of families and 16.6% of the population were below the poverty line, including 20.4% of those under age 18 and 17.6% of those age 65 or over.

Education
Students in Maysville attend R-1 Elementary and Maysville R-1 Jr./Sr. High School.

References

External links
 Maysville School District
 Historic maps of Maysville in the Sanborn Maps of Missouri Collection at the University of Missouri

Cities in DeKalb County, Missouri
County seats in Missouri
St. Joseph, Missouri metropolitan area
Cities in Missouri
1845 establishments in Missouri